Alam-Linda is a village in Abkhazia, Georgia.

The village was established by Estonians in 19th century. As of 2011, probably no Estonians live there.

References

Populated places in Sukhumi District
Estonian diaspora